Harvey L. Dueholm (January 29, 1910May 29, 1980) was an American dairy farmer and Democratic politician.  He served 20 years in the Wisconsin State Assembly, representing Polk and Burnett counties.

Biography
Born in the town of Bone Lake, Wisconsin, Dueholm received a high school education at Luck High School and spent nearly his entire life working on his family's dairy farm.  He became associated with the Wisconsin Progressive Party, a breakaway faction from the Republican Party of Wisconsin which held significant power in the state during the 1930s and 1940s.  But as the party began to dissolve in the late 1940s, Dueholm followed the majority of the progressives into the Democratic Party of Wisconsin.

In 1945, he was elected town council chairman of Luck, Wisconsin, where he served for the next 14 years.  He also became a member of the Polk County board of supervisors, and was chairman from 1957 to 1959.

In 1958, he was elected to the Wisconsin State Assembly, representing the Polk and Burnett district.  He defeated incumbent Republican Lowell A. Nelson, and went on to beat him in again in a close rematch in 1960.  He was subsequently reelected eight more times.  He announced he would not seek an 11th term in 1978, and left office in January 1979.

Dueholm was known for his defense of the University of Wisconsin, when it came under right-wing attack in the midst of protests against the Vietnam War, and for his advocacy for civil rights.  Although he never served in party leadership, he was extremely popular among his colleagues.

Personal life and family
Dueholm was the eldest son of Marius Dueholm, a Danish American immigrant who came to Polk County as a child with his family.  Marius Dueholm was also a member of the Wisconsin State Assembly, representing Polk County for six years from 1931 to 1937.

Harvey Dueholm and his wife, Hazel, had four sons together.  Their son Robert would also serve in the Wisconsin State Assembly in the same district his father once represented.

Dueholm battled cancer for over 20 years before his death in 1980.  He nearly lost reelection in 1966 and 1968 due to voters believing he would die before the end of his term.  In May 1980, he underwent brain surgery to remove a tumor from his brain.  He died from complications from the surgery a few days later, on May 29, 1980.

Dave Obey, who represented northwest Wisconsin in the United States House of Representatives for 42 years (from 1969 to 2011), referred to Dueholm, who he served with in the Assembly, as his political mentor.  In a statement, Obey said, "Harvey Dueholm cared more about justice, fairness, and the rights of each and every human being to reach his or her full potential than any legislators with whom I have ever served.  He had a sense of rage about injustice and hypocrisy and used it on many occasions to make his colleauges' votes match their conscience."

Electoral history

Wisconsin Assembly, Burnett–Polk district (1958–1970)

Wisconsin Assembly, 28th district (1972–1976)

References

External links

|-

Democratic Party members of the Wisconsin State Assembly
1910 births
1980 deaths
Wisconsin Progressives (1924)
People from Polk County, Wisconsin
20th-century American politicians